The fourth season of Futurama began airing in 2002 and concluded after 18 episodes on August 10, 2003. 

The complete 18 episodes of the season have been released on a box set called Futurama: Volume Four, on DVD and VHS. It was first released in Region 2 on November 24, 2003, with releases in other regions following in 2004. The season was re-released as Futurama: Volume 4, with entirely different packaging to match the newer season releases on July 17, 2012.

This is the last season that composer, Christopher Tyng, used a live orchestra before switching to a produced score, starting with Season 5. This is also the last season of the show to air on Fox.

Episodes

Reception
The fourth season was met with critical acclaim and remains popular among the show's fanbase. Andy Patrizio of IGN wrote a positive review of the season, giving it a score of 8 out of 10.

Home releases

References

Futurama lists
2002 American television seasons
2003 American television seasons
 
Futurama seasons